Local Rabbits were a Canadian alternative rock band based in Montreal, Quebec, active in the 1990s and early 2000s. The band consisted of vocalists and guitarists Peter Elkas and Ben Gunning, bassist Ryan Myshrall and drummer Jay Tustin.

Background
Local Rabbits formed in 1990 when its members were teenagers. At first they performed covers of blues music. The band released two albums on Murderecords.

In 1997 the band went out on a North American tour. They toured with The Super Friendz, The Inbreds, Thrush Hermit, Kelley Deal 6000, and Sloan, and performed as Neko Case's backing band on several Lilith Fair dates. Their second album, Basic Concept, reached No. 1 on the Canadian campus radio charts in 1998.

The band  signed to Halifax indie label Brobdingnagianin 2001 for their third and final album, This Is It Here We Go. They disbanded soon after, although they reunited in 2007 to record a track for the Rheostatics tribute album The Secret Sessions.

Elkas and Gunning have each pursued solo careers, Myshrall has been a member of Clark, Tricky Woo and is currently in the band Sister with Carla and Lynette Gillis of Plumtree, and Tustin was in Soft Canyon and worked as a carpenter on Debbie Travis' Facelift. Gunning, Elkas, and Myshrall reunite on an occasional basis as "Oldies 990" in Toronto.

Discography
The Super Duper EP (1993)
Put on Your Snowsuit, You Are Going to Hell! (1994), 7"
You Can't Touch This (1995)
British Knights Coalition: Consolidate & Strike (1997), 7"
Basic Concept (1998)
This Is It Here We Go (2001)

References

External links
Local Rabbits fan site

Musical groups established in 1990
Musical groups from Montreal
Canadian alternative rock groups
Murderecords artists
English-language musical groups from Quebec